The Trap, also known as Collector's Item, Dead Fright and The Cage, is a 1985 erotic thriller directed by Giuseppe Patroni Griffi (his last theatrical film), and starring Tony Musante, Laura Antonelli, and Florinda Bolkan. Famed Italian horror director Lucio Fulci contributed to the screenplay (this film was done during the time Fulci was recovering from hepatitis, so he was unable to direct it).

The film is based on a story called "L'Occhio", written by filmmaker Francesco Barilli. Barilli intended to make the film himself, but had trouble securing backing and balked at the producers wanting Shelley Winters in the lead role. So he sold the idea to Griffi and let him produce and direct it, retitling it The Trap. Barilli said of the finished product "Lets' talk frankly here, that movie sucks...." and Fulci even used profanity alluding to his opinion of Griffi, who he felt stole his chance to direct the film.

Plot
Michael Parker is a successful American businessman living in Italy with his girlfriend Hélène. However, when she leaves on vacation, Michael soon becomes involved in an affair with Marie, a woman he once had a one-night stand with. This affair proves more difficult for Michael, as Marie is not going to let him off the hook again so easily. To complicate matters worse, Marie's young daughter Jacqueline also finds herself attracted to Michael, resulting in an incestuous love triangle.

Cast
 Laura Antonelli as Marie Colbert
 Tony Musante as Michael Parker
 Florinda Bolkan as Hélène Marcò
 Blanca Marsillach as Jacqueline
 Cristina Marsillach as Marie (young)
 Laura Troschel as Marianne

See also  
 List of Italian films of 1985

References

External links
 

1985 films
1980s erotic thriller films
Spanish erotic thriller films
1980s Italian-language films
Films scored by Ennio Morricone
Italian erotic thriller films
1980s Italian films